Cissusa spadix, the black-dotted brown moth, is a species of moth in the family Erebidae. The species is found from Ontario and Quebec, south through most of the United States, to Arizona and Georgia.

The wingspan is about 35 mm.

References

External links
Image
Bug Guide
Outbreaks of the Black-dotted Brown moth in Georgia

Cissusa
Moths of North America
Moths described in 1780